Unțeni is a commune in Botoșani County, Western Moldavia, Romania. It is composed of seven villages: Burla, Burlești, Mânăstireni, Soroceni, Unțeni, Valea Grajdului and Vultureni.

References

Communes in Botoșani County
Localities in Western Moldavia